A daily double is a parimutuel wager offered by horse and dog racing tracks (and at jai alai frontons) in North America. Bettors wager on the winners of two races, pre-designated by the track for a particular race day. The Daily Racing Form's glossary defines a daily double as two consecutive races.. Because of the increased difficulty of picking two straight winners, winning daily double bets pay off at higher odds than betting both horses to win, or even parlaying them, due to the lack of a second win takeout. The daily double is usually the first two races on the card, but most racetracks have now included a "late daily double"

History
The daily double was the first so-called "exotic" wager offered by North American racetracks. Introduced in 1931 at Ottawa's Connaught Park Racetrack, the wager was typically offered only for the first two races of each day's program as an enticement for spectators to arrive early for the entire program. The wager was also extremely popular at New York City OTB among those who worked in Manhattan, with the lunch-hour wager handling $500,000 or more, compared with only $200,000 for the "late double".

As with all other American racing wagers, the "double" is conducted in parimutuel fashion, but with the number of betting interests in the daily double pool equal to the product of the number of entries in each race. For example, if there are ten entries in the first race and eight in the second, there will be eighty betting interests, one for each combination of two potential winners. This results in higher payoffs than those found in straight betting for win, place, or show.

For many years the daily double was the only exotic wager offered. Later, the "exacta" was also offered on selected races during each program. The wagers were offered only a few times on each card, largely because of the limitations of electro-mechanical totalisator systems. When computer technology took over, more exotic wagers were introduced, such as the "trifecta", "superfecta" and "pick 6". The higher payouts for these wagers tended to diminish interest in the "old-fashioned" daily double, but it is still offered at all tracks, sometimes more than once during a program. A "late double" is frequently offered on the day's final two races; some tracks offer a "rolling double" - a daily double starting on each race on the program except the last race.

The "Pick 3" and "Pick 4" wagers are derived from the daily double. These wagers require bettors to pick the winners of three or four consecutive races. These are also often offered on a rolling basis — a rolling pick 3 on races one to three, another on races two to four, and so on throughout the day.

Occasional doubles are offered on important races contested on separate days. The most prominent example is the "Oaks-Derby Double" offered by Churchill Downs, where bettors pick the winners of the Kentucky Oaks and the Kentucky Derby. The Oaks is run the day before the Derby; the latter is traditionally run on the first Saturday of May.

Daily Double Song
The "Daily Double Song" is played at many racetracks before the national anthem:

I went down to the track one day
with just two bucks from last week's pay
I picked two longshots on the way 
to play the Daily Double

I never thought that I could win
But in the stretch they both flew in
Let the Daily fun begin
I won the Daily Double

Everybody swing around the floor
Have fun like you never had before
Get up, drink up let the spirits flow
Trouble's just a bubble when you win the Daily Double

Everybody clap your hands and shout "Hey Hey"
Here's how you learn what the thrills about
Pick two horses then you'll soon find out
Playday can be payday when you win the Daily Double

Notes

Sports betting
Horse racing terminology
Gambling terminology